Richie Unterberger (born January 19, 1962) is an American author and journalist whose focus is popular music and travel writing.

Life and writing
Unterberger attended the University of Pennsylvania, where he wrote for the university newspaper The Daily Pennsylvanian and in the early 1980s was a deejay on the Penn radio station, WXPN-FM. Just prior to graduating in late 1982, he started reviewing records for Op magazine, which marked the start of his career as a freelance writer.

From 1985 to 1991, Unterberger was an editor for Option. Since 1993, he has been a prolific contributor to AllMusic, the on-line database of music biographies and album reviews, for which he has written thousands of entries, and many of his on-line contributions have been printed in the AllMusic guide series. Unterberger contributes to various local and national publications, including Mojo, Record Collector, Rolling Stone, Oxford American, and No Depression. He has written liner notes for dozens of CD reissues from labels like Rhino Records, Collectors' Choice, and Sundazed.

Unterberger's books draw extensively on first-hand interviews with musicians and their associates.

Travel writing; public speaking
Unterberger has given talks on music and popular culture at public libraries in San Francisco, Berkeley, and San Mateo County, California. He is also a speaker at area bookstores, including The Booksmith in the Haight Ashbury neighborhood of San Francisco.

Unterberger has also written on travel, including The Rough Guide to Seattle (1996), and co-authored  The Rough Guide to Shopping with a Conscience (2007), a book about ethical products, investment, and related topics. He has traveled to more than thirty countries and is an advocate of independent travel and alternative culture.

Family
His nephew, Andrew, formerly wrote for Stylusmagazine.com, and in 2007 was part of the winning team on VH1's World Series of Pop Culture. He has been a staff writer or featured contributor on music and sports blogs.

Selected publications
His books include:
 1998: Unknown Legends of Rock'n'Roll. Profiles of 60 underappreciated cult rock artists of all styles and eras
 1999: The Rough Guide to Music USA. A guidebook to the evolution of regional popular music throughout America in the twentieth century
 2000: Urban Spacemen & Wayfaring Strangers: Overlooked Innovators and Eccentric Visionaries of '60s Rock. Another look at underappreciated cult rock artists
 2002: Turn! Turn! Turn!: The '60s Folk-Rock Revolution. The first part of a history of folk rock
 2003: Eight Miles High: Folk-Rock's Flight from Haight-Ashbury to Woodstock. The second part of a history of folk rock
 2006: The Unreleased Beatles: Music and Film. An illustrated 400-page guide to music that the Beatles recorded but did not release, as well as musical footage of the group that has not been made commercially available (winner of a 2007 Award for Excellence in Historical Recorded Sound Research from the Association for Recorded Sound Collections)
 2009: White Light/White Heat: The Velvet Underground Day-by-Day
 2009: The Rough Guide to Jimi Hendrix.
 2011: Won't Get Fooled Again: The Who from Lifehouse to Quadrophenia

References

External links
 2002 interview with Unterberger
 Richie Unterberger's Unknown Legends at www.richieunterberger.com
 Profile at Rough Guides // [ Allmusic.com] // IMDb
 Article about Richie Unterberger in the SF Weekly

 The WELL interviews on Turn! Turn! Turn! // Eight Miles High // The Unreleased Beatles
 Book review: Fleetwood Mac: The Complete Illustrated History by Richie Unterberger / Rocker Magazine

1962 births
Living people
American people of German descent
AllMusic
American music critics
Rock critics
American travel writers
American male non-fiction writers